Marino Morosini (1181 in Venice – January 1, 1253 in Venice) was the 44th doge of Venice. He governed from 1249 to 1253.

Family 
Marino was one of four members of the Morosini family to be elected doge. The other three were Domenico Morosini (1147-1156), Michele Morosini (1382) and Francesco Morosini (1688-1694).  Four women in the family were married to doges and had the title of dogaressa: Tommasina Morosini was the wife of Pietro Gradenigo, Francesca Morosini was married to Andrea Dandolo, Dea Morosini to Niccolò Tron and Morosina Morosini to Marino Grimani.

Life 

Morosini was elected doge late in life, at the age of 68. At the time of his election, Morosini was the Procurator of Saint Mark's Basilica. During his political career, Morosini also held the position of Duke of Crete.

He was married but did not have any children.

His four-year tenure as doge was a time of peace for Venice, although during this period, Louis IX of France led a crusade against Egypt. Not wanting to jeopardize its trade agreement with the sultan, Venice chose not to participate in the crusade.

Morosini sought to improve relations with the Vatican by making the concession to accept the establishment of a court of inquisition in Venice, but retained the right to appoint the judges. Nevertheless, tensions remained high between Rome and Venice.
    
Upon his death on January 1, 1253, Marino Morosini was interred in the atrium of Saint Mark's Basilica.

Literature 

Claudio Rendina: I dogi. Storia e segreti. Rome 1984.

References 

1181 births
1253 deaths
Burials at St Mark's Basilica
Marino
13th-century Doges of Venice
Dukes of Crete
Burials at Santi Giovanni e Paolo, Venice